Holger Seebach (17 March 1922 – 30 August 2011) was a Danish amateur footballer, who scored 9 goals in 17 games for the Denmark national football team, won a bronze medal at the 1948 Summer Olympics and competed in the 1952 Summer Olympics. Holger Seebach was one of five players from the same Odense Boldklub team, including Jørgen Leschly Sørensen and Svend Jørgen Hansen, who moved to Copenhagen and was selected for the Danish national team, during this period he played for AB and won four Danish championships. Seebach was an wing attacker who tried to score from all angles, and he was known as "always-good-for-a-goal"-Seebach among both teammates and opposition players. Knud Lundberg mentioned him in his book Fodboldens ABC that he had asked Holger Seebach about his goal scoring tactics, and Holger Seebach replied that he used to aim for the goalkeeper but miss him. Knud Lundberg replied that he had tried that tactic without success. He declined an offer from an Italian club to become the second Danish professional football player, and instead focused on his studies in engineering at the Technical University of Denmark.

Personal life
Seebach is related to musicians Tommy Seebach and his sons Nicolai and Rasmus Seebach. Rasmus Seebach's son, Holger, is named after the football player. He studied as a carpenter and later got a Cand. Polit. Engineering degree from Odense Technical University where he continued to work until his retirement in 1999 at the age of 77. He was married twice and is the father of 2 children, Dorte Seebach and Torben Seebach

Honours
AB
 Danish Championship: 1944–45, 1946–47, 1950–51, 1951–52

Denmark
 Olympic Bronze Medal: 1948

References

1922 births
2011 deaths
Association football forwards
Danish men's footballers
Olympic footballers of Denmark
Footballers at the 1948 Summer Olympics
Footballers at the 1952 Summer Olympics
Olympic bronze medalists for Denmark
Olympic medalists in football
Akademisk Boldklub players
Medalists at the 1948 Summer Olympics
Footballers from Aarhus
Boldklubben 1913 players
Odense Boldklub players